Jean-Léon Gérôme (1824–1904) was a French painter and sculptor in the style now known as Academicism.

Gerome may also refer to:

Gerome (given name), an American masculine given name
François Gérôme (born 1895), a French painter
Raymond Gérôme (1920–2002), a Belgian-born, French stage and screen actor
 Gerome, a character in Dragon Valor video game

See also
Jerome (disambiguation)
Munster cheese, or Munster-géromé, a French cheese